Sedlescombe is a village and civil parish in the Rother district of East Sussex, England. The parish includes the hamlet of Kent Street, which is on the A21 road.

The parish is in the High Weald Area of Outstanding Natural Beauty. The River Brede and its tributary the River Line flow through it; Powdermill Reservoir is on its eastern boundary. The 2011 Census recorded the parish's population as 1,476.

Manor
In the reign of Edward the Confessor (1042–66) Countess Godgifu was overlord of the manor of Sedlescombe. Her Lord of the manor was a Saxon called Leofsi, who also held a manor at Marden in what is now West Sussex. The Domesday Book records that by 1086 the Norman nobleman Robert, Count of Eu held the manor of Sedlescombe. His tenant-in-chief was one Walter, son of Lambert, who also held manors at Crowhurst, Hazelhurst and Ripe.  The village name seems to derive from Old English 'setl' meaning a seat or residence, and 'comb' meaning valley or low place

Manor houses
Manor Cottages in The Street are a 15th-century timber-framed building with a 16th-century extension. They were built as a single manor house but later divided into five cottages. They are a Grade I listed building.

Durhamford Manor in Stream Lane is an early 16th-century timber-framed house. It is a Grade II* listed building.

Churches

Church of England
The Church of England parish church of St John the Baptist has a 15th-century Perpendicular Gothic nave, north aisle and west tower. The present chancel, south aisle and south porch were added in 1866–74 as part of a restoration by Norman and Billing. The chancel's north and south windows have stained glass made by CE Kempe in 1890. The building is Grade II* listed.

The west tower has a ring of six bells. Robert Mot of Houndsditch and Whitechapel cast the tenor bell in 1592. Joseph Carter of Whitechapel cast the fifth bell in 1606 and the second, third and fourth bells in 1607. Mears & Stainbank of the Whitechapel Bell Foundry cast the treble bell in 1929.

St John's parish is now part of the Benefice of Sedlescombe with Whatlington.

United Reformed
Sedlescombe has a United Reformed Church.

Other notable buildings
Asselton House in The Street is a 15th-century timber-framed house. Its northwest wing was added in the 19th century.

Pestalozzi International Village is an educational charity founded in 1946. In 1959 it moved to Oaklands, a Tudor Revival house in Sedlescombe. A Warden's House and International House were designed for it by Hugh Casson and Neville Conder and built in the grounds.

Amenities

Sedlescombe has a 15th-century pub, the Queen's Head Inn, that is now a gastropub. There is also a hotel and a bed and breakfast guest house.

The village has a post office and general store and a Church of England primary school.

Just outside the village is Sedlescombe Golf Club, which includes the James Andrews School of Golf.

Notable people
Frederick Hyland (1893–1964), first-class cricketer

See also
Sedlescombe vineyard

References

Sources and further reading

External links

Sedlescombe Parish Council

 
Villages in East Sussex
Rother District
Civil parishes in East Sussex